Kampos is a community in the municipal unit of Pineia, Elis, Greece. It is on the southeastern shore of the Pineios reservoir, 2 km northwest of Efyra, 4 km northeast of Keramidia, 7 km northwest of Simopoulo and 15 km northeast of Amaliada.

Historical population

See also
List of settlements in Elis

References

External links
GTP - Kampos

Populated places in Elis